Cartier may refer to:

People
 Cartier (surname), a surname (including a list of people with the name)
 Cartier Martin (born 1984), American basketball player

Places
 Cartier Island, an island north-west of Australia that is part of Australia's Northern Territory
 Rural Municipality of Cartier, Manitoba
 Cartier, Ontario, a small town in Northern Ontario
 Cartier (electoral district), Quebec
 Mount Cartier, a mountain in British Columbia

Transportation
 Cartier Railway, Quebec, Canada
 Cartier station (Montreal Metro), a subway station in Laval, Quebec, Canada
 Cartier station (Ontario), a train station in Cartier, Ontario, Canada
 De Cartier (Charleroi Metro), a subway station in Charleroi, Belgium

Other uses
 Cartier (jeweler), a French jewellery and watch manufacturer
 Cartier Field, Indiana
 Cartier (typeface)
 Cartier Book
 HMCS Cartier, a surveying ship 
 "Cartier", a song by Bazzi from the album Cosmic

See also
 Port-Cartier, Quebec
 Cartier Racing Award, for horseracing
 The Cartier Project, a novel by Miha Mazzini 
 Fondation Cartier pour l'Art Contemporain (Cartier Foundation for Contemporary Art)
 Macdonald-Cartier (disambiguation)
 
 Chartier (disambiguation)
 Carter (disambiguation)